Jasper Kirkby is a British experimental particle physicist with CERN. He is known for originating the idea for the Tau-Charm Factory, an accelerator for the BEPC II in Beijing. He has led large particle accelerator experiments at SPEAR and the Paul Scherrer Institute.

Early life

CLOUD experiment 

The CLOUD experiment involves investigating possible physical mechanisms for solar/cosmic ray forcing - a theory whereby cloud nucleation is affected by cosmic rays and the cosmic rays are affected by solar activity. The main purpose of the CLOUD experiment is to simulate the conditions under which clouds form in earth's atmosphere—specifically, the process by which cloud condensation nuclei form from aerosols in the atmosphere. Kirkby et al. published the results of CLOUD's first experiment in the journal Nature in 2011, reporting that cosmic rays "seemed to enhance the production of nanometre-sized particles from the gaseous atmosphere by more than a factor of ten." He added, however, that the particles in question are far too small to serve as cloud condensation nuclei, adding, "At the moment, it actually says nothing about a possible cosmic-ray effect on clouds and climate, but it's a very important first step."

References

People associated with CERN
Particle physicists
British physicists
Year of birth missing (living people)
Living people
Cosmic ray physicists